Fimbristylis eremophila is a sedge of the family Cyperaceae that is native to Australia.

It blooms between January and April and produces red-brown flowers.

In Western Australia it is found on sandy plains and along creeks and streams in the Pilbara and Goldfields regions where it grows in red sandy soils.

References

Plants described in 1979
Flora of Western Australia
eremophila